Norwood is an unincorporated community in Township 13, Benton County, Arkansas, United States. It is located is south Benton County near the Washington County line on Arkansas Highway 16. The community had a school which is now closed and listed on the National Register of Historic Places.

References

Unincorporated communities in Benton County, Arkansas
Unincorporated communities in Arkansas